The Donostia-Donostia Klasikoa — Clásica San Sebastián-San Sebastián (San Sebastián Classic) is a one-day professional men's bicycle road race in northern Spain that has been held every summer since 1981 in San Sebastián. It is the most important one-day race in Spain, is considered a one-day race of great prestige, just behind the 'Monuments', and contributes points towards the UCI World Ranking.

It was most recently held on 31 July 2021.

Clásica de San Sebastián is known for its winding, undulating terrain which favours aggressive riding, favouring climbers. It includes the tough Alto de Jaizkibel climb, usually the decisive point of the race. It is one of the three summer classics that form part of the UCI World Tour calendar, along with the Laurentian Classics.

Usually the protagonists of the Clásica de San Sebastián are those who, until a few days before the race have been competing on the roads of the Tour de France, given the proximity of dates of the two competitions. There are many Klasikoa winners who also have a Grand Tour in their palmares.

It has always started and finished in San Sebastián, although the initial and intermediate stretches have varied throughout its history, so its total mileage has not been the same, although it has almost always been around 230 km. The race traditionally finishes at theBoulevard de San Sebastián a major street in the centre of the city.

It is organized by Organizaciones Ciclistas Euskadi, after the merger of the Euskal Bizikleta with the Tour of the Basque Country in 2009.

History

Clásica de San Sebastián is the most important one-day race in Spanish professional road cycling. It was first run in 1981 and has stopped only due to the COVID-19 pandemic. The race was created by a cycling journalist of Diario Vasco and founder/chief of Organizaciones Deportivas Diario Vasco, Jaime Ugarte. He later went on to found Tour of the Basque Country.

Ugarte won the elections to lead the Guipuzcoan Cycling Federation, and one of his first tasks as president was revitalize the track, and the creation of an important race for San Sebastián. Along with his friends and colleagues, José Mari Eceiza and the Ayestarán brothers, they devised the idea of a professional race to inspire amateurs and fans. They designed a race between San Sebastián and Bilbao, but several reasons impeded this, so they decided to focus on Gipuzkoa, where the mountain pass Jaizkibel was located. Helped by UCI president Luis Puig, they placed the race in the highest steps of world cycling.

Ugarte has talked about the creation of the race:

The birth of the race

The race was first organized in 1981. Throughout the 229 kilometers that this race consisted of, the most outstanding note was the hardness of it. Of the 71 riders who took the start, only 30 were able to reach the finish line, on a very hot day and with a huge number of spectators watching the race. The ascent of the five passes that marked the route caused havoc in the peloton. With some skirmishes, the race was relatively calm until the Jaizkibel (which with Azcárate, Karabieta, Udana and Alto de Orio) formed the quintet of great difficulties of the race. There, Marino Lejarreta took off and marched alone towards the finish line. He managed to win again the following year, attacking the rest of the chasing group in Jaizkibel, and reaching Pedro Delgado and Jesús Rodríguez Magro in the breakaway, managing to beat them in the final sprint. He would go on to repeat the feat in 1987. Other important riders who managed to win the race in its first editions include Miguel Induráin, World Champion Claude Criquielion and Classics Allah Adri van der Poel.

Redrawing the climbs

Over the years the organizers have added climbs to complicate the race, as the riders' level has generally improved over the years, making it more of a climbers classic. The course was insufficient for the big group to break up and play for the victory in San Sebastián or in the previous climbs of Gaintzurizketa and especially Miracruz (3 km from the finish), since in some editions it had an outcome similar to that of the Milan–San Remo. After the turn of the century the race has come to be dominated by Puncheurs, All-rounders, and classics specialist who could sustain themselves in climbs, on top of the climbers.

Recent occurrences
In the confusion after Van Avermaet's crash Yates did not realise he had won, so did not initially celebrate when crossing the finishing line.

On 3 August 2019 Remco Evenepoel scored his first World Tour victory when he won the Clásica de San Sebastián. He became the third youngest rider to win a classic.

Route
It has always started and finished in San Sebastián and the initial and intermediate section has been variable in all its editions so its total mileage has not been the same although it has almost always been around 230 km. Its maximum difficulty is the top of Jaizquíbel (classified as 1st category) located in the first editions about 15 km from the finish, although with progressive changes it has been moving away from the finish. Thus in those first editions it was climbed on the Fuenterrabía slope until, in order to offer other alternatives, giving the opportunity to other types of riders and not favoring so much the climbers, it was decided to climb the opposite slope of Pasajes to place the pass at about 30 km from the finish.

Owing to the fact that in 2000 a group of 53 riders arrived after Jaizkibel in 2001, the Gurutze pass (classified as 3rd category) was included, replacing the Gaintzurizketa pass, leaving Jaizkibel 32 km from the finish. This change initially caused a more selected group to arrive. However, after the 2006 edition, in which a group of 51 riders arrived, other alternatives were sought and progressively introduced. In 2008 Gurutze was replaced by Gaintzurizketa+Arkale (catalogued as 2nd category) placing Jaizkibel at 38.5 km from the finish. Then, in 2010, a circuit was added repeating twice the hard part of the race (Jaizkibel and Gaintzurizketa+Arkale). Finally, in 2014, another circuit was introduced inside San Sebastián passing twice through the finish line to climb the Igueldo pass -on the slope called Bordako Tontorra- (classified as 2nd category) at 7 km from the finish line, but leaving the last pass through Jaizkibel at 53.9 km from the finish line. This last change has not been without criticism since it can condition the race a lot as it could avoid distant attacks and favor climbers something that was wanted to be avoided in the first editions.

In the 2018 edition the race continues to be run in the surroundings of the province of Guipuzcoa in the Basque Country up to the city of San Sebastián, likewise, the total number of mountain passes is maintained with 8 passes, of which Jaizquíbel and Arkale are climbed twice with the purpose of causing a strong selection in the race, later the cyclists face the last pass of Murgil Tontorra with a length of 1.8 kilometers at 11.3% to then descend and finish above the city of San Sebastián.

Jaizkibel

The Jaizikbel is often a decisive climb in the Clásica San Sebastián. Nowadays the hill is climbed twice in the race and during the last passage a small group of riders remains at the front of the race and are able to win the Clásica San Sebastián. The Jaizkibel is followed by the Alto de Arkale climb with the top only fourteen kilometers from the finish in San Sebastián.

Current climbs

Winners

Multiple winners
Riders in italics are active.

Wins per country

Women's race
In 2019, a women's race was added. The women's race covers 127 km and follows a similar route to the men, including a climb of the Jaizkibel.

Wins per country

External links

References

 
UCI ProTour races
Classic cycle races
Cycle races in the Basque Country
Recurring sporting events established in 1981
1981 establishments in Spain
UCI Road World Cup races
UCI World Tour races
Annual sporting events in Spain
Sport in San Sebastián
Super Prestige Pernod races